"Trying To Be Me" is the first single by Sweetbox from the album Classified, with Jade Villalon as a frontwoman. The song is based on "Solveig's Song" from Edvard Grieg's Peer Gynt Suite. The song features Mucky as a guest vocalist, who also featured as a background vocalist in some of the other songs from the Classified album.

One of its remixes can be found on the Japanese version of the album Classified (2001). The remix, titled "Trying To Be Me (RMX)" (from the Japanese version of "Classified") is the same remix as the one found on the Europe/Korea release, which is titled "Trying To Be Me (Geo's Remix)."

Track listing

Charts

Sources

Sweetbox songs
2000 songs
Songs written by Jade Villalon
Peer Gynt (Grieg)

hu:Cinderella (dal)